"Arabian Knights" is a song by English post-punk band Siouxsie and the Banshees. The track was written by Siouxsie and the Banshees and co-produced with Nigel Gray. It was released in 1981 as the second and final single released from their fourth studio album, Juju.

Content and release 
Siouxsie later commented on the lyrics: "With 'Arabian Knights' it was quite a thrill to get the word 'orifices' on the radio." The B-side, "Supernatural Thing", was originally recorded by Ben E. King, appearing on his 1975 album Supernatural. The  extra B-side, "Congo Conga", was misspelled as "Conga Conga" on the U.S. edition of the 12".
"Arabian Knights" was released on 24 July 1981 by record label Polydor. The single peaked at number 32 on the UK Singles Chart in 1981.

Music, reception and legacy 
The Guardian retrospectively qualified "Arabian Knights" as a "pop marvel" while AllMusic described it as "dreamy".

Billy Corgan of the Smashing Pumpkins selected it in his playlist in December 2014 when he talked about some of his favourite music on BBC radio.

Cover versions
Paul Roland covered "Arabian Knights" on his 1992 album Strychnine, while Icky Blossoms released it as a single in 2013. Las Aves also covered it during a live session for French Television in 2014.

Track listing 
 7"

 12"

Charts

References

1981 singles
Songs about Asia
Songs based on fairy tales
Siouxsie and the Banshees songs
Polydor Records singles
Music based on One Thousand and One Nights
Song recordings produced by Nigel Gray
1981 songs
Songs written by Siouxsie Sioux
Songs written by Steven Severin
Songs written by John McGeoch
Songs written by Budgie (musician)